Events from the year 2000 in art.

Events
February – Opening of the New Art Gallery Walsall in the West Midlands of England.
13 February – The final original Peanuts comic strip is published, following the death of its creator, Charles Schulz.
9 March – The FBI arrests art forgery suspect Ely Sakhai in New York City.
May – Christie's withdraws a forgery of Paul Gauguin's Vase de Fleurs (Lilas) from auction.
11 May – Official opening of the Tate Modern in London.
12 October – Official opening of The Lowry theatre and gallery centre in Salford, England (designed by Michael Wilford and Buro Happold).
22 December – Nationalmuseum robbery: a self-portrait by Rembrandt and two Renoir paintings are stolen from the museum in Stockholm in Sweden.
Full date unknown
First publication of the Hockney–Falco thesis in art history.
Constantine Andreou receives the Légion d'honneur.

Exhibitions
Felix Gonzalez-Torres retrospective at the Serpentine Gallery, London
Jean-Baptiste-Siméon Chardin exhibition at the Metropolitan Museum of Art, New York City
Excessivism exhibition at the LA Artcore Gallery, Los Angeles, CA

Works

Jake and Dinos Chapman – Hell
Eduardo Chillida – Berlin (sculpture)
Martin Creed – Work No. 227: The lights going on and off (installation)
Lucian Freud - After Cézanne
Diana Lee Jackson – Statue of Bill Bowerman (sculpture, Eugene, Oregon)
Leo Lankinen (died 1996) – Cross of Sorrow (memorial in Russian Karelia)
 Lorenzo Pace – Triumph of the Human Spirit (public monument, Foley Square, New York City)
Tad Savinar – Constellation (sculpture series, Portland, Oregon)
Ian Sinclair, Jackie Staude, David Davies and Alistair Knox – Fairfield Industrial Dog Object
Betty Spindler – Hot Dog (ceramic sculpture, Smithsonian American Art Museum)
Paul Tzanetopoulos with Ted Tonio Tanaka  architects – "Untitled" (kinetic light instillation, LAX, Los Angeles)
Rachel Whiteread – Judenplatz Holocaust Memorial, Vienna
Bill Woodrow – Regardless of History, for the Fourth plinth, Trafalgar Square, London
Makoto Yukimura – Planetes

Awards
Archibald Prize – Adam Cullen, Portrait of David Wenham
Beck's Futures – Roderick Buchanan
Hugo Boss Prize – Marjetica Potrč
Turner Prize – Wolfgang Tillmans

Films
Pollock

Deaths
17 January – Norman Blamey, British painter (b. 1914)
19 February – Friedensreich Hundertwasser, Austrian painter, architect and sculptor (b. 1928)
26 February – Louisa Matthíasdóttir, Icelandic-American painter (b. 1917)
31 March – Gisèle Freund, German-born French photographer (b. 1908)
15 April
Edward Gorey, American illustrator (b. 1925)
Todd Webb, American photographer (b. 1905)
16 April – Henry Bird, British muralist (b. 1909)
26 April – Gregory Gillespie, American magic realist painter (b. 1936)
8 May – Stanley Boxer, American painter (b. 1926)
3 June – Leonard Baskin, American sculptor, book-illustrator, wood-engraver, printmaker and graphic artist (b. 1922)
9 June – Jacob Lawrence, African American painter (b. 1917)
2 July - Constance Howard, English textile artist (b. 1910)
10 July – Gertrud Arndt, German photographer (b. 1903)
17 July – Aligi Sassu, Italian painter and sculptor (b. 1912)
5 August – Tullio Crali, Italian Futurist painter (b. 1910)
25 August – Carl Barks, American illustrator and comic book creator (b. 1901)
19 September – Anthony Robert Klitz, English artist (b. 1917)
19 October – Hans Moller, German born American painter
3 December – Frank Roper, English metal sculptor and stained glass artist (b. 1914)
4 December – Ansgar Elde, Swedish ceramic artist (b. 1933)

References

 
 
2000s in art
Years of the 20th century in art